Thomas Joseph Sherman (born December 5, 1945) was an American football quarterback for the American Football League's Cincinnati Bengals (1968), Boston Patriots (1968–69), and Buffalo Bills (1969).  In two seasons in the AFL, he played in 19 games and completed 92 of 228 passes for 1,219 Yards, 13 touchdowns and 16 interceptions.  He also had 58 rushing attempts for 468 yards and 1 touchdown.

Sherman signed with the New York Stars of the World Football League in 1974. The Stars moved to Charlotte, North Carolina midway through the 1974 WFL season and became the Hornets. Tom played for the Charlotte Hornets in 1975 until the league folded in the twelfth week of the season on October 22, 1975.

External links
Just Sports Stats

1945 births
Living people
American football quarterbacks
Calgary Stampeders players
Charlotte Hornets (WFL) players
Cincinnati Bengals players
Boston Patriots players
Buffalo Bills players
New York Stars players
Penn State Nittany Lions football players
People from Bellevue, Pennsylvania
Players of American football from Pennsylvania
American Football League players
Canadian football quarterbacks